Timothy Joseph "Tim" Maude (November 18, 1947 – September 11, 2001) was a United States Army officer who was killed in the September 11 attacks at The Pentagon.

Maude, a lieutenant general, was the highest ranking U.S. military officer killed in the September 11 attacks and the most senior United States Army officer killed by foreign action since the death of Lieutenant General Simon Bolivar Buckner Jr. on June 18, 1945, in the Battle of Okinawa during World War II. Maude had been serving as the U.S. Army's Deputy Chief of Staff for Personnel and was at a meeting when American Airlines Flight 77 crashed into the west side of the Pentagon. His offices had just days before been moved to the most recently renovated section of the Pentagon.

Early life
Maude was born in Indianapolis, Indiana, on November 18, 1947. He joined the United States Army as an enlisted soldier on March 21, 1966 when he was eighteen years old. He initially intended to become a priest and graduated from the Latin School of Indianapolis, a Roman Catholic seminary high school, but received his commission as a second lieutenant upon completing Officer Candidate School in February 1967. He earned a Bachelor of Arts in management from Golden Gate University and a Master of Public Administration from Ball State University.

Career
Upon commission, Maude served one year in South Vietnam. The remainder of his career was spent in the continental United States, West Germany, and South Korea. His assignments included:
Deputy Chief of Staff for Personnel and Installation Management, Seventh United States Army, also known as United States Army Europe (USAREUR) and Seventh Army 
Deputy Chief of Staff for Personnel

Maude was stationed in Washington, D.C. by August 1998 and was nominated as Deputy Chief of Staff for Personnel by President Clinton's Secretary of Defense, William S. Cohen, in May 2000.

Maude began the "Army of One" recruiting campaign, primarily utilizing television and internet advertising. He testified before the U.S. Congress concerning the necessity of meeting recruiting goals to fulfill the United States Army's missions. In September 2001, he announced that the Army of One campaign was drawing more recruits. On September 4, 2001, it was reported that the United States Army had met its goals early for active duty Soldiers and that the United States Army Reserve and United States Army National Guard would meet theirs by the end of the month.

Views on homosexuality
Maude was a "point man" for the Don't Ask Don't Tell policy and matters concerning LGBT issues. When Private First Class Barry Winchell was murdered by Calvin Glover because it was rumored that Winchell was gay, Maude was one of the Army leaders who met with Winchell's mother, Patricia Kutteles.

C. Dixon Osburn, Executive Director of Servicemembers Legal Defense Network, said in a press release: "Lt. Gen. Maude has played a pivotal role in developing and implementing key programs related to LGBT military personnel."

Death
On September 11, 2001, Maude was working as the United States Army's Deputy Chief of Staff for Personnel and was in a meeting when American Airlines Flight 77 crashed into the west side of the Pentagon. His offices had just days before been moved to the most recently renovated section of the Pentagon. He was the highest ranking military officer killed in the attacks, and the senior-most United States Army officer killed by foreign action since the death of Lieutenant General Simon Bolivar Buckner Jr. on June 18, 1945, in the Battle of Okinawa during World War II.

Personal life
Maude was survived by his wife, Teri, and two daughters, Karen Maude and Kathleen Koehler.

Awards and decorations

Legacy

Maude was interred at Arlington National Cemetery on October 6, 2001. Almost seven months later, on April 30, 2002, the Lieutenant General Timothy J. Maude Center for Human Resources was dedicated in his honor at the Campbell Barracks in Heidelberg, Germany, where he served from 1995 to 1998 as the Deputy Chief of Staff for Personnel and Installation Management. It was his last assignment before being stationed in Washington, D.C.

In 2010, the United States Army Human Resources Command named their new Center of Excellence at Fort Knox, Kentucky after Maude.

At the National 9/11 Memorial, Maude is memorialized at the South Pool, on Panel S-74.

The Knights of Columbus named the Timothy J. Maude Council 10292 in Wiesbaden, Germany in Maude's memory.

References

Further reading

External links

 Timothy J. Maude at ArlingtonCemetery.net, an unofficial website

 Biography of Timothy J. Maude at Maude Foundation

1947 births
2001 deaths
United States Army personnel of the Vietnam War
American terrorism victims
Ball State University alumni
Burials at Arlington National Cemetery
Golden Gate University alumni
People from Indianapolis
Recipients of the Defense Superior Service Medal
Recipients of the Distinguished Service Medal (US Army)
Recipients of the Legion of Merit
Terrorism deaths in Virginia
United States Army generals
Victims of the September 11 attacks
People murdered in Virginia
Recipients of the Meritorious Service Medal (United States)